Lecithocera noseropa is a moth in the family Lecithoceridae. It was described by Turner in 1919. It is found in Australia, where it has been recorded from Queensland.

The wingspan is about 10 mm. The forewings are brown-whitish with slight fuscous irroration. The stigmata are obsolete. The hindwings are pale-grey.

References

Moths described in 1919
noseropa